Politics of the Northern Mariana Islands takes place in a framework of a presidential representative democratic system, whereby the Governor is head of government, and of a pluriform multi-party system. The Northern Mariana Islands is an unincorporated territory of the United States, and in a political union with it in the form of a commonwealth. Executive power is exercised by the governor. Legislative power is vested in the two chambers of the legislature. The judiciary is independent of the executive and the legislature. Local government is carried out through three regional mayors.

The Northern Mariana Islands and the United States of America reached a Covenant Agreement which became fully effective on November 4, 1986. The Constitution of the Commonwealth of the Northern Mariana Islands became effective on January 1, 1978.

Executive branch

|Governor
|Ralph Torres
|Republican Party
|December 28, 2015
|-
|Lieutenant Governor
|Arnold Palacios
|Republican Party
|January 14, 2019
|}

Department Level Cabinet Positions

Sub-cabinet level divisions and offices

Legislative branch
The Northern Mariana Islands Commonwealth Legislature has two chambers. The House of Representatives has 20 members, elected for a two-year term from seven districts. The Senate has 9 members, elected for a four-year term in two staggered classes.

Prior to January 2009, the Commonwealth maintained an elected "Resident Representative" in Washington, DC. The first election was held on November 4, 2008.

Political parties and elections

Judicial branch
Commonwealth Supreme Court; Superior Court; Federal District Court

Federal representation
In November 2008, the Northern Mariana Islands held its first election for a delegate to the United States Congress. Gregorio "Kilili" Sablan won the election, and began his term of office in January 2009. The delegate serves as a member to some House committees and may vote in those committees, but the delegate is not permitted to vote on bills up for vote among all members of the House.

International organization participation
 United Nations Economic and Social Commission for Asia and the Pacific (associate)
 INTERPOL (subbureau)
 Pacific Community

Political culture
Historically the Northern Mariana Islands have been subject to the colonizing powers of Spain, Germany, Japan, and the United States under a United Nations Trust Territory of the Pacific Islands Agreement.  Each power contributed elements that mixed with local indigenous cultures to form the current political culture of the Northern Mariana Islands.

United States citizenship was granted in 1986.  Politics in the Northern Mariana Islands is often "more a function of family relationships and personal loyalties" where the size of one's extended family is more important than a candidate's personal qualifications. Both scholarly works and the authors of the controversial website Saipansucks.com charge that this is nepotism carried out within the trappings of democracy.

References